The Administration for Technical Investigations (AET) is a division of the Luxembourgish Ministry of Transport that investigates air, rail, river, and maritime accidents. The agency has its headquarters in Luxembourg City.

The agency investigated the crash of Luxair Flight 9642.

See also

 Direction de l'Aviation Civile

References

External links
 Administration for Technical Investigations
 Administration for Technical Investigations  (November 2016 Archive)
 Administration for Technical Investigations  (Archive)

Aviation in Luxembourg
Government agencies of Luxembourg
Luxembourg
Rail accident investigators
Transport safety organizations
Transport organisations based in Luxembourg